Apha arisana is a moth of the family Eupterotidae first described by Shōnen Matsumura in 1927. It is found in China and Taiwan.

Taxonomy
Apha arisana is allied to Apha horishana and both species were described as subspecies of Apha tychoona by Matsumura in 1927. They were later raised to species status by Yasunori Kishida in 1978.

References

Moths described in 1927
Eupterotinae
Taxa named by Shōnen Matsumura